Glass Enclosure is the tenth album led by jazz pianist and mathematician Rob Schneiderman, released on the Reservoir label in 2008.

Reception

In his review on AllMusic, Ken Dryden opined "Schneiderman devours Bud Powell's dramatic "Glass Enclosure" whole, while his sense of humor comes across in an easygoing take of Charlie Parker's "Yardbird Suite" as he slyly inserts a low-key quote from the Latin tune "Tico Tico." In his review on DownBeat, Robert Doerschuk stated "Rob Schneiderman steers a straightahead course throughout Glass Enclosure... While everyone plays with a pleasing and relaxed authority, Schneiderman pushes a little further..."

Track listing

Track listing adapted from Discogs.

Credits

 Charles McPherson - Alto Saxophone (tracks: 1 to 4, 7, 10)
 Todd Coolman - Bass
 B. Robert Johnson - Design, Photography
 Leroy Williams - Drums
 Brian Montgomery - Engineer [Assistant]
 Jim Anderson - Engineer [Recording]
 Rob Schneiderman - Liner Notes
 Allan Tucker - Mastereing
 Abigail Feldman - Photography
 Rob Schneiderman - Piano 
 Mark Feldman - Producer

References

Rob Schneiderman albums
2008 albums